Kenneth Gustavsson or Gustafsson may refer to:
 Kenneth Gustafsson (footballer, born 1982), Swedish footballer for Gunnilse IS
 Kenneth Gustafsson (footballer, born 1983), Swedish footballer for GAIS
 Kenta (musician) (Kenneth Gustafsson, 1948–2003), Swedish musician
 Kenneth Gustavsson (photographer) (1946–2009), Swedish photographer